is a series of Japanese light novels written by Tomo Takabayashi and illustrated by Temari Matsumoto. The story follows the adventures of Yuri Shibuya, an average 15-year-old Japanese high school student, who is suddenly transported to another world where he is told that he is now the king of demons.

Yuri becomes the king of a nation where all of the citizens are demons, but they appear indistinguishable from humans. Their only distinguishing traits are their long lives and the ability to use magic. The people of the Demon Tribe are able to make a pact with an element after which they can then use magic of that element. Covenant Castle is in the capital of the Demon Kingdom. It is the residence of the demon king. The culture of The Great Demon Kingdom is very different from the Japanese culture Yuri is accustomed to, and the differences make for amusing mishaps with long-ranging consequences, such as an accidental proposal of marriage.

The series was adapted into an anime in 2004 by NHK and a manga in 2005 serialized in Asuka magazine. The manga was updated for release by VIZ Media and launched in North America on September 30, 2014.

Plot

While on his way home from school, Yuri Shibuya sees his classmate, Ken Murata, being harassed by bullies. When Yuri intervenes, Murata runs away, and Yuri becomes their new target. They force him into the girls' bathroom and shove his face into a toilet, where a portal suddenly appears. Yuri is sucked in and is rendered unconscious. He wakes up to discover himself in a strange world where no one speaks Japanese.

He is taken to the capital by Günter and Conrad. When he arrives at the castle, he meets Wolfram and Gwendal, who find it hard to believe that Yuri is their new king. At dinner the next day, Yuri slaps Wolfram after the latter insults Yuri's mother for being human. Unknown to Yuri, among the nobles in the Demon Kingdom, a slap on the cheek is considered a marriage proposal. Wolfram is insulted and immediately challenges him to a duel by throwing his knife on the floor. Yuri, again being unfamiliar with the kingdom's customs, picks up the knife, unknowingly accepting the duel. After Yuri wins by using magical powers he was unaware he possessed, he is accepted as the true demon king.

The story follows Yuri on his adventures trying to learn the ways of the Great Demon Kingdom while battling discrimination and fear. He does not know much of the world but applies his moral judgment onto every situation in order to find a peaceful outcome. His ultimate goal is to bring peace to both demons and humans, hoping to one day live together while avoiding war at all costs. Even though he has the choice of leaving his responsibilities to his advisers, he continues to involve himself in most affairs in the belief that to be a great king he must be willing to know his subjects and risk everything to protect the kingdom.

Yuri also battles with the notion of belonging to one world. While he misses his home in Japan on Earth, he develops a family and home in the Great Demon Kingdom, which leads to some very hard choices.

Although romance is not a main focus of the story, the anime has been noted for its shōnen-ai undertones. For example, Yuri and Wolfram are engaged, and a number of jokes in the series revolve around misunderstandings that arise from this arrangement.

Media

Light novels

Written by Tomo Takabayashi with illustrations by Temari Matsumoto. The novels are released under Kadokawa's Beans Collection.
The first novel was released in November 2000. There are currently 22 books in the series. 17 are main story novels and the other 5 are extras and side stories which provide background and other information to the story.

Manga

Drawn by Temari Matsumoto, the Kyo Kara Maoh! manga series (Titled Kyō Kara MA no Tsuku Jiyūgyō! (今日からマのつく自由業!) in Japanese) debuted in June 2005 issue of the monthly Asuka magazine on April 23, 2005, and ended on July 23, 2016. The first volume of the manga was released on December 26, 2005 and 21 volumes total have been released.

An English-language version of the manga was licensed by Tokyopop but when Tokyopop shut down their North American branch in 2011 all of their licenses were cancelled. They released seven volumes of the manga before they shut down. After 3 years, VIZ Media licensed a digital release in North America, releasing the seven volumes in 2014.

Anime

The anime adaptation of Kyo Kara Maoh was directed by Junji Nishimura, animated by Studio Deen, and produced by NHK. It aired across Japan on NHK. The series consists of 117 episodes and 5 OVA episodes.
While much the first season follows the original story from the novels, the plot in the following seasons varies drastically.

The anime was originally licensed for release in North America by Geneon under the title Kyo Kara Maoh! God(?) Save Our King!, but when Geneon ceased production of their titles in late 2007, it left three volumes of the second season unreleased on DVD in North America. On July 3, 2008, Geneon Entertainment and Funimation Entertainment announced an agreement to distribute select titles in North America. While Geneon Entertainment will still retain the license, Funimation Entertainment will assume exclusive rights to the manufacturing, marketing, sales and distribution of select titles. Kyo Kara Maoh! was one of the titles involved in the deal. In August 2011, Funimation announced that the license expired and that they had no plans to renew the license. On February 22, 2019, Discotek Media announced its license of the first season for an April 30, 2019 Blu-ray release.

Musical
In April 2013 the series was adapted into a musical titled Kyo Kara Maoh! Birth of the Maou. It showed for 11 days during golden week at the Hakuhinkan theater. It was produced by Sōgō Vision.

Reception
Carlo Santos called the series "an unusual take on the fantasy genre" due to its "toilet portals between worlds" and its "same-sex engagement.  Chris Beveridge. Mania called the series a mixture of fantasy, baseball, and slice of life genres, saying it works "really well.'. Danica Davidson, Graphic Novel Reporter called the manga a "fun and whimsical read" which has fascinating characters and "a strong storyline."

References

External links

Official (FUNimation) website
Official novel site 
Official Anime(NHK) website 
Official Anime Blog 
Official Radio Show Website

2000 Japanese novels
2004 anime television series debuts
2005 anime television series debuts
2005 manga
2006 video games
2007 anime OVAs
2008 anime television series debuts
2000s Japanese LGBT-related television series
Anime and manga based on light novels
Comedy anime and manga
Discotek Media
Geneon USA
Isekai anime and manga
Isekai novels and light novels
Japan-exclusive video games
Japanese LGBT-related animated television series
Kadokawa Beans Bunko
Kadokawa Dwango franchises
Kadokawa Shoten manga
Light novels
PlayStation 2 games
PlayStation 2-only games
Studio Deen
Tokyopop titles
Video games developed in Japan
Visual novels
Viz Media manga
Yaoi anime and manga
Yaoi light novels
Yaoi video games